Yevgeniya Aleksandrovna Bochkaryova (June 10 1980, Penza, USSR) is a Russian athlete, represented rhythmic gymnastics in team exercises. Bronze medalist at the 1996 Summer Olympics in team exercises. Honoured Master of Sports of Russia in rhythmic gymnastics (1996). She was awarded Medal of the Order "For Merit to the Fatherland" II degree.

Biography 
Yevgeniya Bochkaryova trained at the Penza Regional Specialized Children and Youth School of the Olympic Reserve in rhythmic gymnastics. In 1993, at the European Youth Cup, she won silver and bronze medals. At the Rhythmic Gymnastics World Championships 1995 Yevgeniya won a bronze medal, and in Rhythmic Gymnastics World Championships 1996 she won silver and bronze medals. In 1996, as part of the Russian national gymnastics team under the leadership of Marina Vasilievna Fateeva Yevgeniya Bochkaryova won the bronze medal in the 1996 Summer Olympics in group exercises. In the same year she was awarded the title of Honoured Master of Sports of the Russian Federation. Yevgeniya graduated from the Faculty of Physical Education Penza State University in 2002.

In 2021, Oleg Melnichenko, Governor of the Penza Region, was appointed Minister of Physical Culture and Sports of the Penza Region.

References 

 

1980 births
Living people
Russian rhythmic gymnasts
Gymnasts at the 1996 Summer Olympics
Olympic gymnasts of Russia
Olympic bronze medalists for Russia
Olympic medalists in gymnastics
Sportspeople from Penza
Penza State University alumni

Medalists at the 1996 Summer Olympics